IncoNet-Data Management S.A.L. (IDM) is a Lebanese Internet Service Provider (ISP) and is one of the first ISPs to acquire a license in Lebanon. The company was born in 2001, following the merging of two of the country’s leading internet providers: Data Management and Inconet, amid the local and worldwide recession. IDM is also a sister company of Cyberia.

History 
Established in 1995.

Services

 ADSL
 3G
 Dial-up Regular and 56k
 Broadband Corporate (Leased Line and Microwave)
 I-Fly: WiMAX Technology
 IDM MOBI
 IDM Wireless Box
 Wi-Fi HotSpots
 Web Development and Programming
 Security Solutions for Corporate and End-users
 Corporate SMS
 E-marketing

See also 

 Cyberia
 Alfa Telecom
 Touch

References 

Internet service providers of Lebanon
Telecommunications companies established in 1995
1995 establishments in Lebanon